Bearhead Mountain is located in the Lewis Range, Glacier National Park in the U.S. state of Montana. The mountain is named for kyáiyótokan, a Piegan warrior known for his war against the dreaded Assiniboine White Dog.  kyáiyótokan was also a survivor of the Marias Massacre and the brother of Chief Heavy Runner a confidant of Glacier author James Willard Schultz.

See also
 Mountains and mountain ranges of Glacier National Park (U.S.)

References

Mountains of Flathead County, Montana
Mountains of Glacier County, Montana
Mountains of Glacier National Park (U.S.)
Lewis Range
Mountains of Montana